Kayli Carter is an American actress.  She played Sadie Rose in the Netflix western TV series Godless, and Amber McCarden in the movie Bad Education, opposite Hugh Jackman and Allison Janney.  Her role in Private Life was nominated for an Independent Spirit Award for Best Supporting Female.

Early life
Carter was raised in Oviedo, Florida. Her father works in construction and her mother is a therapist. She studied acting at Savannah College of Art and Design, (SCAD) Georgia, earning a Bachelor of Fine Arts degree in Performing Arts. Originally from Chuluota, Florida, Carter has performed on stage in her first professional theater role in Mark Rylance's play Nice Fish on The West End in London, at St. Ann's Warehouse in Brooklyn, New York City and at the American Repertory Theater in Cambridge, Massachusetts.

Career
In 2017, Carter starred as Sadie Rose in the Netflix western TV series Godless starring alongside Michelle Dockery, Merritt Wever, and Jeff Daniels. The same year saw Carter teaming up with Merritt Wever again as Squeaky Fromme in the Mary Harron directed Charles Manson biographical drama film Charlie Says alongside Hannah Murray and Matt Smith

In 2019 she starred  as Amber McCarden in the movie Bad Education, opposite Hugh Jackman and Allison Janney. Carter played Pamela in the 2020 TV mini-series Mrs. America alongside Cate Blanchett. Carter also portrayed Lorna Blackledge, the daughter-in-law of retired sheriff (Kevin Costner) and his wife (Diane Lane) in Universal Pictures 2020 film Let Him Go.

In 2021, Carter joined the cast of The Marvelous Mrs. Maisel for season 4 of the comedy series in a recurring role.

Awards and nominations
Carter was nominated for an Independent Spirit Award for Best Supporting Female and was named A Hamptons International Film Festival Breakthrough Artist  for her role in the 2018 film Private Life.

Filmography

Film

Television

Awards and nominations

References

External links

 
Kayli Carter Instagram

1993 births
Living people
Savannah College of Art and Design alumni
21st-century American actresses
People from Oviedo, Florida
Actresses from Florida
American film actresses
American television actresses